"D. Original" is a song co-written and performed by American hip hop musician Jeru the Damaja, issued as the second single from his debut studio album The Sun Rises in the East. In 1994, the song peaked at #22 on the Billboard rap chart but it fared better on the dance chart, where it peaked at #6.

"D. Original" contains samples of "Give It to You" by Upp; "We Write the Songs" by Marley Marl, Heavy D and Biz Markie; and "I'm the Man" by Gang Starr. Since the song's release, it has been sampled in "Expanding Man" by Dilated Peoples; "Nasty As I Wanna Be" by Dirt Nasty; "B-Boys Revenge 96 Porkopolis Turntable Jazz" by Mr. Dibbs; and "Streetwise" by Termanology.

Music video

The official music video for "D. Original" was directed by Lionel C. Martin.

Chart positions

References

External links
 
 

1993 songs
1994 singles
Jeru the Damaja songs
FFRR Records singles
Music videos directed by Lionel C. Martin
Song recordings produced by DJ Premier
Songs written by Jeru the Damaja
Songs written by DJ Premier